Gatineau-Ottawa Executive Airport ( or Ottawa/Gatineau Airport)  is an international airport serving Gatineau, Quebec, Canada, and its metropolitan area known as the National Capital Region.

The airport is equipped with Canada Customs facilities for aircraft coming from outside Canada, car rental counters, and restaurant services. It has a single,  asphalt runway oriented east–west. Since January 2017, the airport's Quebec City route has been serviced by Air Liaison. Most residents of Gatineau use the nearby Ottawa Macdonald–Cartier International Airport, or travel to Montréal-Pierre Elliott Trudeau International Airport.

The airport was inaugurated in 1978 and transferred to the City of Gatineau in 1991.

The airport houses the Vintage Wings of Canada, a nationwide non-for-profit organization that educates youth by use of vintage aircraft. The airport hosts an annual Aero Gatineau-Ottawa air show.

Tenants
Vintage Wings of Canada - historical aircraft collection and youth education organization
Go SkyDive - skydiving
Hélicraft 2000 Inc. - helicopter pilot training
International Pilot Academy - private, commercial and airline pilot license training

See also
 List of airports in the Ottawa area
 Executive airport

References

External links

 Executive Gatineau-Ottawa Airport
 Page about this airport on * COPA's Places to Fly airport directory

Transport in Gatineau
Certified airports in Outaouais
1978 establishments in Quebec